Marilyn Buferd (January 30, 1925 – March 27, 1990) was an American film and television actress as well as the winner of both the Miss California and Miss America pageants of 1946. During the latter half of the 1940s and throughout the 1950s, she performed in nearly two dozen American, Italian, and French films, including Touchez pas au grisbi opposite Jean Gabin (1954). Buford also appears in several television series originally broadcast in the 1950s, such as The Millionaire, Highway Patrol, Schlitz Playhouse, The Ford Television Theatre, and Orient Express.

Biography
Buferd attended the University of California, Los Angeles. One of the sixteen finalists she defeated in the Miss America 1946 pageant was future Academy Award-winning actress Cloris Leachman.

Buferd married Franco Barbaro, an Italian submarine commander and a movie agent and producer.  After divorcing she married Han E. Orton.  Her third husband was Milton Stevens. Buferd died of pancreatic cancer at age 65 in Austin, Texas, on March 27, 1990. Her son, Nick Barbaro, is publisher of The Austin Chronicle and co-founder of South by Southwest.

Selected filmography
 A Night of Fame (1949)
 Totò Tarzan (1950)
The Elusive Twelve (1950)
 I'm the Capataz (1951)
 The Blind Woman of Sorrento (1952)
 Les Belles de nuit (1952) directed by René Clair
 The Machine to Kill Bad People (1952) directed by Roberto Rossellini
 Touchez pas au grisbi (1954) directed by Jacques Becker
 The Unearthly (1957)
 Queen of Outer Space (1958)

References

External links

1925 births
1990 deaths
Miss America 1940s delegates
Miss America winners
Miss America Preliminary Swimsuit winners
American film actresses
20th-century American actresses
Actresses from Detroit
Deaths from pancreatic cancer
Deaths from cancer in Texas